The New South Wales Minister for Health  is a minister in the New South Wales Government and has responsibilities which includes all hospitals, health services, and medical research in New South Wales, Australia.

The current Minister for Health, since 30 January 2017 is Brad Hazzard. He is supported by the Minister for Mental Health and the Minister for Regional Health, currently Bronnie Taylor, since April 2019; and the Minister for Regional Youth, currently Ben Franklin, since December 2021.

Together they administer the health portfolio through the Health cluster, including the Ministry of Health, its Office of Medical Research, and a range of other government agencies, including local health districts and the NSW Ambulance service.  

Ultimately, the ministers are responsible to the Parliament of New South Wales.

Office history
The role of a government advisor and administrator on medical policy in New South Wales began in 1914, with the appointment of Fred Flowers as the Minister for Public Health. However the medical portfolio had been administered in the government since 1848 when the first "Medical Adviser to the Government" was appointed, with his office reporting to the Colonial Secretary. Following the amalgamation of the Board of Health and the Medical Advisor to the Government a "Department of Public Health" was established in April 1904, headed by the President of the Board of Health. This department was abolished in 1913 and was replaced by the "Office of the Director-General of Public Health" which, like its predecessor, operated under the supervision of the Colonial Secretary. Upon Flowers' appointment as Minister for Public Health, a dedicated government minister supervised the portfolio while remaining the junior minister to the Colonial Secretary. The office was reconstituted as a fully independent "Department of Public Health" headed by the Minister (titled Minister for Health since 1930) in 1938.

The department existed until its abolition in 1972 with the passing of the Health Commission Act 1972 which created the "Health Commission of New South Wales" headed by the minister. In December 1982 the Health Commission was abolished by the Health Administration Act 1982 and replaced by the Department of Health. On 5 October 2011 the Department was renamed the "Ministry of Health".

List of ministers

Health

Mental health

Regional health

Regional youth

Former ministerial titles

Cancer

Healthy lifestyles

Hospitals

Medical research

Assistant ministers

See also 

List of New South Wales government agencies

Notes

References

External links
NSW Ministry of Health

Health
New South Wales
Health in New South Wales